Seducing Cindy was a Fox Reality Channel original series that followed the newly single Cindy Margolis on her search for love. The eight-episode, one-hour series premiered on Saturday, January 30, 2010 and ended on March 20, 2010. Due to Fox Reality Channel being discontinued on March 29, 2010, it was the final original series.

Contestants

 John decided it was too loud and rowdy in the house, and decided to leave.
 Nathan missed his kids and decided to leave.

Episodes

References

External links

2010 American television series debuts
2010 American television series endings
2010s American reality television series